The Netball Quad Series is an annual international netball series contested by the national teams of Australia, England, New Zealand and South Africa.

Background 

In December 2015, the governing bodies of netball in Australia, New Zealand, England and South Africa formed SANZEA, an international partnership of the four nations to organise a new international netball competition to be played on a regular basis. The four governing bodies had discussed such a proposal in 2012, though it took four years before the partnership could be formalised. The purpose of the series is to provide the strongest netball nations with the opportunity to play regularly scheduled international test matches with meaningful outcomes for the players and competition.

The series – originally referred to as the International Netball Super Series – was introduced to the public in March 2016, when SANZEA announced the schedule for the inaugural series, to be held later that year in mostly New Zealand venues.

Format 
The series is contested by four nations (Australia, England, New Zealand and South Africa), with each nation to play one test match against their opponents. The nation that records the highest number of wins and the highest overall margin is considered the winner of the series. At this stage, SANZEA has agreed to conduct a reciprocal benefit scheme, whereby one series is played in Australia and/or New Zealand, and the following series is played in England and/or South Africa, before the process repeats over the following years. The inaugural series was hosted in Australian and New Zealand venues. Since 2017 the series has mostly been played twice annually, once in the first half of the year in January/February (matches held in England and/or South Africa) and again in the second half of the year in August/September (matches held in Australia and New Zealand). Only one series was held in 2019. Australia elected not to compete in January 2020, with the series replaced by the Netball Nations Cup, featuring the original three nations and Jamaica. The series had been planned to recommence later that year, though this was forced to be abandoned due to travel restrictions imposed by the COVID-19 pandemic.

Results

Broadcasting
Quad Series matches are broadcast in all four of the competing nations. In the United Kingdom, Sky Sports is the exclusive rights holder of all six matches in the series, the network broadcasting the 2016 series on Sky Sports Mix. In Australia, the Nine Network broadcasts Australian matches on its digital mult-channel 9Gem. Sky Sport broadcasts matches in New Zealand and SuperSport is the exclusive broadcaster for South African audiences.

References

External links 

 
International netball competitions